Keith Webb Wright (9 January 1942 – 13 January 2015) was an Australian politician, teacher, and Baptist preacher who was Leader of the Labor Party in Queensland and Leader of the Opposition in Queensland between 1982–1984. Following his career in state politics, Wright sat in federal parliament for Labor between 1984–1993 in the seat of Capricornia. 

In 1993, while a member of parliament, Wright was jailed for eight years for indecent dealing and child rape.

Biography
Born in Toowoomba, Queensland, Wright was educated at the University of Queensland and Kelvin Grove Teachers College in Brisbane before becoming a Rockhampton teacher and Baptist preacher.

On 17 May 1969, Wright was elected to the Legislative Assembly of Queensland as the Labor member for Rockhampton South and after a seat redistribution, represented Rockhampton (1972–1984). In 1982, he became Leader of the Opposition. Wright remained opposition leader until he left the Assembly in 1984, transferring to federal politics as the Labor MP for Capricornia in the Australian House of Representatives.

In 1993, Wright was charged with indecently dealing and child rape, and as a result lost his Labor endorsement. He contested the 1993 election as an independent, gaining 5.9% of the vote but losing to endorsed ALP candidate Marjorie Henzell. In December 1993 he was convicted and jailed for nine years for raping and indecently dealing with two young girls.

After leaving jail, Wright moved to Vietnam and ran a company, International Language Academy Australia, which trains TESOL teachers in Southeast Asia.

Wright died in Vietnam on 13 January 2015, aged 73.

References

|-

External links
 Queensland Parliament biographical information, including brief details of conviction

1942 births
2015 deaths
Australian Labor Party members of the Parliament of Australia
Independent members of the Parliament of Australia
Members of the Australian House of Representatives
Members of the Australian House of Representatives for Capricornia
Members of the Queensland Legislative Assembly
People from Toowoomba
Leaders of the Opposition in Queensland
Australian people convicted of child sexual abuse
Australian politicians convicted of crimes
Politicians convicted of sex offences
20th-century Australian politicians